Kean is a musical with a book by Peter Stone and music and lyrics by Robert Wright and George Forrest.

Using material by Jean-Paul Sartre and Alexandre Dumas, père as its source, it centers on the adventures of Edmund Kean, considered the greatest Shakespearean actor of the early 19th century, focusing primarily mainly on his wild behavior offstage. Trouble ensues as Kean desperately tries to juggle the two women in his life - the Danish Ambassador's wife, Elena, and a young aspiring actress, Anna.

After one preview, the Broadway production, directed and choreographed by Jack Cole, opened on November 2, 1961 at the Broadway Theatre, where it ran for 92 performances. The cast included Roderick Cook, Alfred Drake, Larry Fuller, Christopher Hewett, Joan Weldon, and Lee Venora.

Drake was nominated for the Tony Award for Best Actor in a Musical, and the show was nominated for Best Conductor and Musical Director.

An original cast recording was released by Columbia Records. This album is one of the most valuable original cast albums because of its scarcity.

Song list

Act I
 Penny Plain, Tuppence Colored
 Man and Shadow
 Mayfair Affair
 Sweet Danger
 Queue at Drury Lane
 King of London
 To Look Upon My Love
 Let's Improvise
 Elena
 Social Whirl
 The Fog and the Grog

Act II
 Civilized People
 Service for Service
 Willow, Willow, Willow
 Fracas at Old Drury
 Chime In
 Swept Away
 Domesticity
 Clown of London
 Apology?

External links
 Kean at the Internet Broadway Database
 Kean at the Music Theatre International website

1961 musicals
Broadway musicals
Musicals by Peter Stone
Musicals based on works by Alexandre Dumas
Jean-Paul Sartre